Lička Jesenica is a settlement in the Lika region of Croatia, in the municipality of Saborsko, Karlovac County.

History

Culture
Orthodox church of St Elias in Lička Jesenica was built in 1751. The village feast celebrating St. Elias, the saint protector of the village, is traditionally held on August the 2nd.

Demographics
According to the 2011 census, the settlement of Lička Jesenica has 100 inhabitants. This represents 22.52% of its pre-war population according to the 1991 census.

The 1991 census recorded that 98.42% of the village population were ethnic Serbs (437/444),  0.23% were ethic Croats (1/444) and 1.35% were of other ethnic origin (6/444).

Sights
 St. Elias Orthodox Church
 Jasenica river
 the old bridge over the Jasenica river, dating back to 1810

Notable natives and residents

See also 
 Saborsko massacre

References

Populated places in Karlovac County
Serb communities in Croatia